Okenia atkinsonorum is a species of colourful sea slug, specifically a dorid nudibranch, a marine gastropod mollusc in the family Goniodorididae.

Distribution
This species is known from New South Wales, southeastern Australia and probably also from Northern New Zealand.

Description
This brightly coloured species is completely pink. Only the tips of the mantle projections, rhinophores and gills have a darker shade of the same color. It does not have a traditionally shaped mantle, but instead has up to seven lateral appendages or papillae that protrude from the main body.

Ecology
This species feeds on the bryozoan Pleurotoichus clathratus.

References

External links 
 Okenia atkinsonorum on Nudi Pixel

Goniodorididae
Gastropods described in 2007